The Men Album is the sixth solo studio album by Jarboe, released on October 17, 2005 by Atavistic Records.

Track listing

Personnel
Adapted from The Men Album liner notes.

 Jarboe – lead vocals, keyboards (2.6), production (1.7)
Musicians
 Nic Le Ban – guitar (1.7, 1.10), vocals (1.10), production (1.10), mixing (1.10)
 Blixa Bargeld – vocals (1.7, 1.8, 1.9)
 Blind Michael Bradley – vocals (2.9)
 Joseph Budenholzer – guitar (1.4, 1.9), engineering (2.8)
 Chris Connelly – vocals (2.7)
 Iva Davies – vocals (1.3), guitar (1.3), programming (1.3), production (1.3), mixing (1.3)
 William Faith – guitar (1.1, 1.9, 2.4), bass guitar (1.1, 1.9), programming (1.1), percussion (1.6), production (1.1, 1.6, 1.9, 2.4), engineering (1.1, 1.6, 1.9, 2.4), mixing (1.1, 1.6, 2.4, 2.6), editing (1.9)
 Kris Force – bass guitar (2.4), production (2.4), engineering (2.4)
 Percy Howard – vocals (2.1)
 David J – vocals (2.2), production (2.2), engineering (2.2)
 Paz Lenchantin – vocals (1.6, 2.4), violin (1.6), bass guitar (1.9)
 Diana Obscura – vocals (2.9), cello (2.9)
 Monica Richards – vocals (1.6)
 Michael Rollings – drums (1.9)

Additional musicians (cont.)
 Alan Sparhawk – vocals (1.2)
 Steve Von Till – guitar (1.9)
 J.G. Thirlwell – vocals (2.4)
 David Torn – guitar (2.5), production (2.5), engineering (2.5)
 Mika Vainio – vocals (2.3)
Production and additional personnel
 Chad Blinman – production (1.2, 2.7), engineering (1.2, 2.7), mixing (1.2, 2.7), programming (1.2)
 Joe Cassidy – engineering (2.7)
 Chris Griffin – production (1.9, 1.10), engineering (1.9, 1.10), mixing (1.10), editing (1.9, 1.10)
 James Izzo – engineering (2.6, 2.7, 2.10), production (2.6), keyboards (2.6)
 Edward Ka-Spel – production (2.10), engineering (2.10), mixing (2.10)
 Robert Kaechele – production (2.2), engineering (2.2), programming (2.2)
 Haroun Serang – engineering (1.8)
 Lary Seven – production (2.3), engineering (2.3)

Release history

References

External links 
 

2005 albums
Jarboe albums
Atavistic Records albums
Albums produced by Jarboe